In biochemistry, a Janin plot, like a Ramachandran plot, is a way to visualize dihedral angle distributions in protein structures. While a Ramachandran plot relates the two backbone dihedral angles, a Janin plot relates the first side chain dihedral angle χ-1 against χ-2. Because not all amino acids have these dihedral angles, a Janin plot is not applicable to all such acids.

This correlation is different for the various amino acids and can depend on the type of secondary structure (Helix, Sheet, etc.) local to that residue. The plot is named for Joël Janin, who studied these correlations in 1978 with Shoshana Wodak.

References

Plots (graphics)
Biochemistry methods